Pre-1927 Route 16 was a route in New Jersey that ran from Princeton north to Morristown, existing from 1921 to 1927. Today, it is part of the following routes:
 U.S. Route 206
 U.S. Route 202 in New Jersey

U.S. Route 202
16 (pre-1927)